The list of media portrayals of the Canadian Indian residential school system includes examples of works created to highlight the Canadian Indian residential school system, a network of schools established by the Canadian government and administered by church officials to assimilate Indigenous students.

Film and television

Published texts

Stage

References

First Nations education
Education in popular culture
Lists of mass media
Works about genocide